The Test of Economic Literacy or TEL is a standardized test of economics nationally norm-referenced in the United States for use in upper-grade levels of high schools.  It is one of four grade-level specific standardized economics tests (i.e., Basic Economics Test (BET), Test of Economic Knowledge (TEK) and Test of Understanding in College Economics (TUCE) ) sponsored and published by the National Council on Economic Education (NCEE) .

The TEL is in its fourth edition and is available, along with an examiner’s manual, for teachers, school administrators and researchers through the NCEE.  The revision process took place at the National Center for Research in Economic Education (NCREE) and included norm-references that consisted of teacher and student participation from over 100 high schools across the United States.  The TEL has two parallel forms, each composed of forty-five 4-option multiple-choice items with content validity based on the Voluntary National Content Standards in Economics.

External links
 National Center for Research in Economic Education
 National Council on Economic Education

Standardized tests in the United States
Economics education